Byeonsan-bando National Park is a national park in South Korea and was designated in 1988 as the only peninsula based park with a mix of mountains and sea in the country. Byeonsan-bando is divided into two parts which are the Naebyeonsan (mountain area) and the Oebyeonsan (coastal area). There are 996 animal species and 877 different vascular plants within national park.

References

External links 
 The park's page on Korea National Park Service's website

National parks of South Korea
Protected areas established in 1988
Parks in North Jeolla Province
Buan County
Peninsulas of South Korea